Seaman Farm was a historic home and farm complex located at Dix Hills in Suffolk County, New York. The main dwelling was built about 1805 and is a -story, shingled dwelling with a saltbox profile. It has a five-bay, center entrance main facade.  Also on the property are two barns, a corncrib, three sheds, and a well structure.

It was added to the National Register of Historic Places in 1985. The site was left abandoned since 1992, whereupon the barns deteriorated into collapse. The house was permitted to be demolished in 1995.

References

Houses on the National Register of Historic Places in New York (state)
Houses completed in 1805
Houses in Suffolk County, New York
1805 establishments in New York (state)
National Register of Historic Places in Suffolk County, New York